José Luis Cabión Dianta (born 14 November 1983) is Chilean footballer who plays for Deportes Melipilla as midfielder.

On 17 May 2021, he was elected councilor of Melipilla representing centre-right party Political Evolution (Evópoli).

Club career
Born in San Antonio, he began his career at Deportes Melipilla of the Chilean second tier. Following Melipilla's promotion to first tier in 2007 he became the team's captain, which allowed him call-ups for Chile national team friendlies and then, even, the Copa América held in Venezuela.

His performances made that Chilean powerhouse Colo-Colo noticed him, so that he joined Estadio Monumental–based side in July 2007. He was a regular player into Claudio Borghi scheme, being an occasional player in the starting lineup for league and international games. However, the 2008 season wasn't successful for Cabión, as he was relegated to the reserves and had a fight with Rodolfo Moya during training, that triggered in his loan to Everton de Viña del Mar, freshly Chilean champion in the age.

After an inconspicuous spell at Everton, he was released from the team in December 2008 and then joined Santiago Morning (on loan too) to face the 2009 season. Then he played the entire 2010 for Cobresal on loan.

In 2011, he returned Colo-Colo first-team and was a regular starter with coach Américo Gallego at Copa Libertadores and league games. Nevertheless, on mid-year he left the club and again joined Cobresal.

In 2013, Cabión moved Azerbaijan's Neftchi Baku after a successful trial, agreeing a 6-month contract. There he helped Neftchi to win the Azerbaijan Cup.

In July 2013, he returned to Chile and joined Rangers, being loaned to Santiago Morning in 2014.

In 2015, he returned to Cobresal, to face the local tournament and the Copa Libertadores.

International career
He made his first international cap in a 3–0 win over Cuba at Rubén Marcos Peralta Stadium as a 79th-minute substitution for Boris Rieloff. After participating of regularly way in Chile's 2007 Copa América preparatory friendlies around Caribbean, national team's coach Nelson Acosta included Cabión in Chile's definitive 23-man squad to face the contest. 

During all games of Chile in the cup, he was on the bench, debuting as a 57th-minute substitution for centre-back Gonzalo Jara in a 6–1 thrash with Brazil at Puerto La Cruz.

Coaching career
In August 2022, he assumed as coach of Deportes Melipilla women's team at under-16 level.

Statistics
As of March 1st, 2016

Honours
Melipilla
Primera B de Chile (2): 2004, 2006

Colo-Colo
Primera División de Chile (1): 2007 Clausura

Neftchi Baku
Azerbaijan Cup (1): 2012–13

References

External links
 Cabión at Football-Lineups
 

1983 births
Living people
Chilean people of Italian descent
People from San Antonio, Chile
Chilean footballers
Chile international footballers
Chilean expatriate footballers
Deportes Melipilla footballers
Colo-Colo footballers
Everton de Viña del Mar footballers
Santiago Morning footballers
Cobresal footballers
Neftçi PFK players
Rangers de Talca footballers
Chilean Primera División players
Primera B de Chile players
Azerbaijan Premier League players
2007 Copa América players
Chilean expatriate sportspeople in Azerbaijan
Expatriate footballers in Azerbaijan
Association football midfielders
Chilean football managers
Chilean politicians
21st-century Chilean politicians
Chilean sportsperson-politicians